Prof. J.S. Patil is a Professor of Law and the former Vice-Chancellor of National Law University and Judicial Academy, Assam. He was the Founder Vice-Chancellor of Karnataka State Law University, Hubli, 2009–12.

Early life and education
Jaiprakashreddy Sannabasanagouda Patil was born in an agriculturist family at Manvi, Raichur district, Karnataka. He qualified in law from Karnataka University, Dharwad in 1977, and pursued LL.M. from the University of Mysore, and earned his master's degree in 1979. He received his PhD from Saurashtra University, Rajkot in 1997.

Books and publications 

 Legal Regime of the Seabed, 1981, Deep & Deep Publications, New Delhi
 Gramina Janate Mattu Kanunu, Prasaranga, Gulbarga University, Kalaburagi
 Tulanatmaka Kanunu, 1995, Vidyanidhi Prakashana, Gadag
 Mahile Mattu Kanunu, 1996, Prasaranga Gulbarga University, Kalaburagi
 Nyaya Shastra Adhyayana, 1996 Ramashraya publications, Dharwad
 Bhrata Sakshya Adhiniyama, 1996 Ramashraya Publications, Dharwad
 Karnataka Bhu-Sudharane Adhiniyama, 1996, Ramashraya Publications, Dharwad
 Karnataka Diwani Vyavaharanegala Niyamagalu, 1997, Ramashraya Publications, Dharwad
 "Sri Gangadhar Namoshi", a book published by the Government of Karnataka
 Spirit of Human Rights, A Manual, 2005, published by National Human Rights Commission, New Delhi
 Intellectual Property Rights, A Manual, 2005, published by Siddhartha Law College, Kalaburagi

References

External links
 From the Vice Chancellor's Desk

Living people
1954 births
Karnatak University alumni
University of Mysore alumni
20th-century Indian lawyers
21st-century Indian lawyers